Diomède was a  74-gun ship of the line of the French Navy built at Lorient and launched in 1799 as Union . She was renamed Diomède in 1803.

During the War of the Third Coalition, Diomède was part of a French force that sailed from Brest, France, on 13 December 1805 for what was planned as a 14-month cruise to attack British merchant shipping while avoiding combat with major Royal Navy forces. On 15 December 1805, the French force split into two squadrons which proceeded independently from one another. Diomède was part of the squadron under the overall command of Vice-Admiral Corentin-Urbain Leissègues, which headed across the Atlantic Ocean bound for the Caribbean. During the voyage, Diomède suffered serious damage in a storm off the Azores in late December 1805. She arrived with most of the squadron at French-held Santo Domingo on Hispaniola on 20 January 1806, where Leissègues ordered the ships to be recaulked after their long and difficult transatlantic voyage.

On the morning of 6 February 1806, a Royal Navy squadron under the command of Vice-Admiral Sir John Thomas Duckworth arrived off Santo Domingo to attack Leissègues's force. Although several of Leissègues's ships were not yet ready for sea, Leissègues ordered them to get underway and sail westward along the coast of Hispaniola toward Nizao. In the resulting Battle of San Domingo, the French squadron maintained close formation, and the five French ships of the line formed a line of battle with Diomède third in line behind Alexandre and Impérial and ahead of Jupiter and Brave. Duckworth ordered his squadron to concentrate fire on the three leading French ships of the line, and accordingly the British 74-gun third-rate ship of the line  opened fire on Impérial and Diomède simultaneously. As the engagement at the head of the French line became confused, with ships of the two sides intermingled and smoke restricting visibility, Diomède came across the 98-gun second-rate ship of the line  and fired a heavy broadside into her, after which Atlas engaged her an close range. Spencer also resumed firing at Diomède. As the British ships moved out of gunnery range, the crews of Diomède and Impérial assembled on deck to abandon ship. Diomède had suffered about 250 casualties.

Leissègues ordered Diomède and Impérial burned as soon as their crews had completed their abandonment of the ships, but before that order could be carried out, boat crews from the fifth-rate frigates  and HMS Magicienne boarded them on 8 February 1806 and captured them without meeting any resistance. The British boarding party took 150 prisoners aboard Diomède including her commanding officer, Captain Jean-Baptiste Henry, and then burned her wreck.

References

Bibliography
 
 
 

Ships of the line of the French Navy
Téméraire-class ships of the line
1799 ships
Shipwrecks in the Caribbean Sea
Maritime incidents in 1806
Ships built in France
Ship fires